Shabalinsky (masculine), Shabalinskaya (feminine), or Shabalinskoye (neuter) may refer to:
Shabalinsky District, a district of Kirov Oblast, Russia
Shabalinskoye, a rural locality (a village) in Kirov Oblast, Russia